The Tiger's Shadow is a 1928 American drama film serial directed by Spencer Gordon Bennet.

Cast
 Gladys McConnell as Jane Barstow
 Hugh Allan as Larry Trent
 Frank Lackteen as Dr. Sandro
 Edward Cecil as Slayton
 Harry Semels as Hawks
 Broderick O'Farrell as Amos Crain
 Henry Hebert as Andre Blane
 Paul Weigel as Martin Meeker
 F.F. Guenste as Briggs, the Butler
 John Webb Dillion as Ladd, the Gardener
 Floyd Ames as Marks
 Bruce Gordon as Bennie
 Jean Porter as Flora
 Richard Cramer as RoughHouse Rowan
 George Kern as Boss Collins
 Blackie Whiteford as McCord

See also
 List of film serials
 List of film serials by studio

References

External links

1928 films
American silent serial films
1928 drama films
American black-and-white films
Films directed by Spencer Gordon Bennet
Silent American drama films
1920s American films
1920s English-language films